Amélie Belin was a French painter and pastellist. From Toulouse, she studied in that city with Bonnemaison and Jacquemin, and in 1787 was awarded the prix de la peinture for her work. That same year, she exhibited a number of portraits in pastel at the Salon de Toulouse.

References

French women painters
18th-century French painters
18th-century French women artists
Pastel artists
Artists from Toulouse
Year of death missing